Raphe (from ) has several different meanings in science.

In botany and planktology it is commonly used when describing a seam or ridge on diatoms or seeds.

In animal anatomy it is used to describe a ridged union of continuous biological tissue. There are several different significant anatomical raphes:

 The raphe nucleus is a moderate-size cluster of nuclei found in the brain stem that releases serotonin to the rest of the brain. Selective serotonin reuptake inhibitor (SSRI) antidepressants are believed to act at these nuclei.
 The buccal raphe, which is on the cheek and evidence of the fusion of the maxillary and mandibular processes
 The lingual raphe on the tongue. Obvious physical evidence of the lingual raphe includes the frenulum (also called the frenum), or band of mucous membrane that is visible under the tongue attaching it to the floor of the mouth. If this raphe is too tight at birth, movement of the tongue is restricted and the child is said to be "tongue tied".
 The palatine raphe on the roof of the mouth (or palate). Incomplete fusion of the palatine raphe results in a congenital defect known as cleft palate.
 The pharyngeal raphe joins the left and right pharyngeal constrictors.
 The perineal raphe extends from the anus, through the mid-line of the scrotum (scrotal raphe), and upwards through the ventral mid-line aspect of the penis (penile raphe) in males.  In females, it extends from the anus, through the mid-line of the perineum to the posterior junction of the labia majora.
 The anococcygeal raphe, an alternative name for the anococcygeal body
 The iliococcygeal raphe 
 The pterygomandibular raphe
 The lateral palpebral raphe
 The mylohyoid raphe

Teratology

In teratology, a malformation or congenital disorder involving a raphe, such as spina bifida, is known as a dysraphism.

References